There were 18 Wrestling events at the 2018 South American Games in Cochabamba, Bolivia. 12 for men (six freestyle and six Greco-Roman) and six freestyle events for women. The events were held between June 5 and 7 at the Coliseo Jose Villazon. This event was a qualification event for the 2019 Pan American Games in Lima, Peru, where the top athlete not already qualified in each event, qualified a quota spot for their country.

Medal summary

Medal table

Medallists
Athletes in bold qualified their country a quota spot for the 2019 Pan American Games.

Men's freestyle

Men's Greco-Roman

Women's freestyle

See also
Wrestling at the 2019 Pan American Games – Qualification

References

External links
Results book

2018 South American Games events
2018
Qualification tournaments for the 2019 Pan American Games
South American Games